Beniamino Facchinelli (8 July 1839 – 29 November 1895) was an Italian photographer working in Cairo, Egypt during the late 19th century.  Most of his known work is housed in the Bibliothèque nationale de France and has been recently digitized.

Gallery

Bibliography
Ola Seif, "Topographical Photography in Cairo : The Lens of Beniamino Facchinelli" in Mercedes Volait (dir.), Le Caire.Dessiné et photographié au XIXe siècle, Paris : Picard  CNRS, 2013 (D'une rive l'autre), p. 195-214

External links

 Works by Beniamino Facchinelli at Bibliothèque nationale de France
 Works by Beniamino Facchinelli at Getty Research Institute
 "Facchinelli, Beniamino" - Agorha, INHA

Photographers from Cairo
Italian photographers
Italian photojournalists
Italian expatriates in Egypt
1839 births
1895 deaths